Gabriel Eduardo Lama Valenzuela (born March 2, 1974 in Santiago) is a Chilean judoka, who competed in the men's middleweight category. He picked up a total of twelve medals in his career, including a bronze from the 2002 South American Games in Rio de Janeiro, Brazil, and represented his nation Chile in the 90-kg class in two editions of the Olympic Games (2000 and 2004).

Lama participated in the 2000 Summer Olympics in Sydney, where he competed in the men's 90-kg division. In his opening match, Lama conceded with a chui penalty and succumbed to yuko from Azerbaijan's Rasul Salimov at the end of the five-minute bout.

At the 2004 Summer Olympics in Athens, Lama qualified as a lone judoka for his second Chilean squad in the men's middleweight class (90 kg), by placing seventh and granting a berth from the World Championships in Osaka, Japan. Lama failed to improve his feat from the previous Games, as he received two penalties for passivity and fell in an inner-thigh throw (uchi mata) and a waza-ari defeat from U.S. judoka Brian Olson at the closure of their five-minute, first round match.

References

External links

1974 births
Living people
Chilean male judoka
Olympic judoka of Chile
Judoka at the 2000 Summer Olympics
Judoka at the 2004 Summer Olympics
Sportspeople from Santiago
South American Games bronze medalists for Chile
South American Games medalists in judo
Competitors at the 2002 South American Games
20th-century Chilean people
21st-century Chilean people